Navasen is a village in the municipality of Simeonovgrad, in Haskovo Province, in southern Bulgaria.

References

Villages in Haskovo Province